Maurizio Aquino (born 1 March 1990) is a Belgian footballer who last played for KFC Oosterwijk, and previously played in the Pro League for Genk.

External links

1990 births
Living people
Belgian footballers
K.R.C. Genk players
Sportspeople from Genk
Footballers from Limburg (Belgium)
Association football forwards